Busuttil is a Maltese surname, probably a derivative of the medieval Maltese surname Busittin – meaning master of 60 men. Notable people with the surname include:

Albert Busuttil (1891-1956), Maltese philosopher
Carmel Busuttil (born 1964), Maltese footballer
George Busuttil (born 1939), Maltese diplomat
Jeanne-Marie Busuttil (born 1976), French golfer
Simon Busuttil (born 1969), Maltese politician
Vincenzo Busuttil (1860-1922), Maltese poet

References